Noel Castree FAcSS (born 2 April 1968) is a British geographer whose research has focused on capitalism-environment relationships and, more recently, on the role that various experts play in discourses about global environmental change. He is currently the editor-in-chief of the peer-reviewed journal Progress in Human Geography.

Background

Castree was born in Bury, Greater Manchester, UK and has a BA in Geography (first class honours) from the University of Oxford, and an MA (1992) and PhD from the University of British Columbia (May, 1999). He taught for 5 years at Liverpool University before joining the University of Manchester in 2000 and becoming a Professor of Geography in the School of Environment and Development in 2004. In January 2014 he joined the University of Wollongong in Australia, in a new Department of Geography & Sustainable Communities. He returned to Geography at Manchester University in late 2017, before becoming an associate dean (research) at UTS in Sydney three years later.

Key contributions

His "principal interests are in the political economy of environmental change, regulation and contestation". He has sought to develop and apply Marxian approaches to understanding a range of environmental problems, with an emphasis on understanding the meaning and limits of 'commodification'.". 
One of his main intellectual contributions to the discipline of geography is advancing the concept of "social nature", which mediates between social constructivist and materialist perspectives on the biophysical world that people interact with; another is explaining the 'neoliberalisation of nature' in the context of 21st century carbon-intensive capitalism. His more recent research focuses on who get to speak for the Earth and humanity in light of growing concerns about a global environmental crisis. He has served twice as a managing editor of peer review journals, once for Antipode and more recently for Progress in Human Geography. He is also the founding editor of Environment & Planning F: Philosophy, Theory, Models, Methods and Practice (Sage publishers).

Awards
In 1993 Castree received a Governor General of Canada's Gold Medal for his master's degree performance at UBC. In 2005, he received the Gill Memorial Award from the Royal Geographical Society. In 2008 he was nominated chair of the RGS-IBG conference held in London. In 2012 he was made a Fellow of the British Academy of Social Science. In 2019 he won a lifetime achievement award from the publisher Taylor and Francis for the impact of his books, articles and chapters.

Publications
Books Authored 
Castree, N., Charnock, G. & Christophers, B. 2022 David Harvey: A Critical Introduction To His Thought. London and New York: Routledge.
Castree, N. 2014. Making sense of nature. London and New York: Routledge.
Castree, N., Kitchin, R & Rogers, A. 2013 Oxford Dictionary of Human Geography. Oxford: Oxford University Press.
Castree, N. 2005. Nature: the adventures of a concept. London: Routledge. Ch.1
Castree, N., Coe N., K. Ward & M. Samers. 2004. Spaces of work. London & Thousand Oaks: Sage.

Edited
Castree, N., Hulme, M. & Proctor, J. (eds.) 2018 A Companion to Environmental Studies London: Routledge
Richardson, D., Castree, N. et al. (eds.) 2017 International Encyclopedia of Geography (in 15 volumes) Malden: Wiley Blackwell.
Castree N. and D. Gregory (eds.) 2011. Human Geography. Major Works in Social Science, the Humanities and the Physical Sciences. London, Thousand Oaks and New Delhi: Sage.
Castree N., P. Chatterton, N. Heynen, W. Larner & M. Wright (eds.) 2010. The point is to change it. Antipode Book Series. Oxford and Malden: Wiley-Blackwell.
 Castree N., D. Demeritt, D. Liverman & B. Rhoads (eds.) 2009. A Companion to Environmental Geography.  Oxford and Malden: Wiley-Blackwell.
R. Kitchin, N. Thrift, N. Castree, M. Crang and M. Domosh (eds.) 2009.  International Encyclopedia of Human Geography. Amsterdam: Elsevier. 2nd edition published 2019.
Castree, N., D. Gregory (eds.) 2006. David Harvey: a Critical Reader. London and New York: Blackwell. 
Castree, N., A. Rogers, D. Sherman (eds.) 2005. Questioning geography: essays on a contested discipline. Oxford and New York: Blackwell.
Castree, N., B. Braun (eds.) 2001. Social nature: theory, practice and politics. Oxford and Malden: Blackwell.
Braun, B. and Castree, N. (eds.) 1998.  Remaking reality: nature at the millennium. London & New York: Routledge.

References

External links
Curriculum Vitae of Noel Castree

Academics of the University of Manchester
Academic staff of the University of Wollongong
British geographers
Fellows of the Academy of Social Sciences
1968 births
Living people
People from Bury, Greater Manchester
Academic journal editors